Ilto Managed Reserve is a protected area in Akhmeta Municipality in Kakheti region of Georgia.

Ilto Managed Reserve  is part of Batsara-Babaneuri Protected Areas which also includes Batsara Strict Nature Reserve and Babaneuri Strict Nature Reserve.

Ilto Managed Reserve includes the parts of the head of Ilto valley. It borders Batsara Strict Nature Reserve located in Pankisi Gorge to the east.

Ilto Managed Reserve was established in order to protect and restore precious wood species and characteristic fauna.

Fauna 
Birds that are common in area include buzzard, hawk, Eurasian sparrowhawk, eagle. Rarely  bearded vulture has been observed also.
Mammal species are represented by  hedgehogs, martens, rabbits, badgers, jackals, foxes, wolves, wild boar, bear, deer, lynx and chamois. The otter  is rather rare.

See also
Batsara Strict Nature Reserve

References 

Managed reserves of Georgia (country)
Protected areas established in 2003
Geography of Kakheti
Tourist attractions in Kakheti